Jah Works is a roots reggae band from Baltimore, Maryland. They have been a member of the Armed Forces Entertainment (AFE) since 2002. Since that time, they have travelled and performed in Hawaii, The Marshall Islands, Guam, South Korea, Japan, Singapore and Diego Garcia in 2004. Their most recent AFE tour ended in February 2007. On this tour they played for U.S. troops stationed in Kuwait, Qatar, Djibouti, United Arab Emirates, Bahrain and Saudi Arabia.

Founding
The band was formed by Loyola College in Maryland students while studying abroad in Belgium. Their name comes from the song Jah Works by the reggae group The Gladiators.

Discography

Studio albums
 Feast Or Famine (1994)
 Send The Rain (1996)
 Taking Off Tomorrow (1998)
 Bassmentality (2001)
 Hard To Find (2005)
 One For You (2007)
 Rewind (2009)
 Believe (2016)

Live albums
 Live Vol. 1 (1999)
 Live Vol. 2 (2003)

References

Musical groups from Baltimore
American reggae musical groups
Loyola University Maryland alumni